Robin Wikman (born 21 January 1986) is a Finnish-Swedish former footballer who last played for FC Stockholm Internazionale. He holds both Finnish and Swedish citizenship.

Career 
He has previously played four seasons in Landskrona BoIS; one season by BK Häcken, Hammarby IF and Nacka FF.

International 
He was a member of the Finnish U-21 national football team during the u21 2009 campaign.

Notes

Living people
1986 births
Finnish footballers
Finland under-21 international footballers
Landskrona BoIS players
BK Häcken players
Hammarby Fotboll players
Allsvenskan players
Finnish expatriate footballers
Expatriate footballers in Sweden
Boo FK players
Association football defenders
Footballers from Helsinki